Biba Wila Creek is a stream in the U.S. state of Mississippi. It is a tributary to Trim Cane Creek.

Biba Wila Creek is a name derived from the Choctaw language meaning "where the mulberry trees stand in rows".

References

Rivers of Mississippi
Rivers of Oktibbeha County, Mississippi
Mississippi placenames of Native American origin